Tiffin Township, Ohio may refer to:

Tiffin Township, Adams County, Ohio
Tiffin Township, Defiance County, Ohio

Ohio township disambiguation pages